Queen Victoria Pavilion is one of the oldest statues in Visakhapatnam. It is located in the One Town area of Visakhapatnam.

History
In the year 1900, Raja G.V. Jugga Rao, the Zamindar of Shermuhammadpuram and Raja Aiktam Venkata Jagga Rao of Yambrum Estates visited Britain. On their way back, the British Government presented with a bronze statue of Queen Victoria. The statue was meant to be a present to the city and hence it was brought and affixed in One Town locality of Visakhapatnam.

References

External links

Buildings and structures in Visakhapatnam
Tourist attractions in Visakhapatnam
Queen Victoria